Baffin, Unorganized is part of a larger census division known as the Baffin Region by Statistics Canada and as the Qikiqtaaluk Region by the government of Nunavut, Canada. This area covers the whole Qikiqtaaluk Region outside the 13 communities such as Iqaluit, Resolute or Grise Fiord. Baffin has a rocky mountainous landscape.

Included in the area are the weather station at Eureka and the Canadian Forces base at Alert (CFS Alert).

It is Canada's largest census subdivision in terms of area.

Demographics
Canada 2016 Census
Population (2016): 62
Population change (2011-2016): 1,140.0%
Private dwellings: 21
Area: 
Density: .

Settlements 
 Achiwapaschikisit
 Alert
 Alexandra Fiord
 Amadjuak
 Aquiatulavik Point
 Cape Dyer
 Cape Smith
 Charlton Depot
 Craig Harbour
 Dundas Harbour
 Eureka
 Fort Conger
 Hazen Camp
 Isachsen
 Kekerten
 Killiniq
 Kipisa
 Kivitoo
 Mikwasiskwaw Umitukap Aytakunich
 Nottingham Island
 Nuwata
 Padloping Island
 Polaris
 Port Burwell
 Resolution Island
 Tanquary Camp
 Tupialuviniq

See also 
 Brooman Point Village
 Iglunga
 Port Leopold

References

Qikiqtaaluk Region